French DJ and record producer Madeon has released two studio albums, six EPs, one DJ mix, twenty-one singles, and several other releases.

Albums

Studio albums

Extended plays

DJ mixes

Singles

Other charted songs

Remixes

Mash-ups

Songwriting and production credits

References

Discographies of French artists
Electronic music discographies